For the Good Times is the second album from the American band The Little Willies.  It was recorded in 2010-2011.

Track listing

Charts

Album

Notes

2012 albums
Norah Jones albums